A list of songs recorded by American thrash metal band Slayer.

List

Notes

References

External links
 Slayer at Discogs

Slayer